The Turkish local elections of 2004 were held throughout the eighty-one Provinces of Turkey on 28 March 2004 in order to elect both mayors and councillors to local government positions. All 16 metropolitan and 3,193 district municipalities were up for election, while 3,208 provincial and 34,477 municipal councillors were also elected. More than 50,000 neighbourhood presidents (muhtars) were also elected, though these do not have any political affiliations.

With almost 42 percent of votes across the country, the ruling AKP increased the 34 percent it won in the 2002 national parliamentary elections by an extra 8 percent. The only opposition party with representation in Parliament, the Kemalist Republican People's Party (CHP), received 19 percent of the votes. The traditional parties of the Turkish establishment lost further ground. The Nationalist Movement Party (MHP), despite suffering a loss of 6% in their popular vote share, won above 10% of the votes. This bode well for their 2007 general election prospects, since 10% is the election threshold needed to win seats in Parliament.

In the event, the CHP was only able to maintain a degree of support in the provincial regions on the Turkish west coast. Among the four major cities the party was only able to win Izmir, with the AKP winning a majority in the cities of Istanbul, Adana and the Turkish capital, Ankara. The AKP also took the tourist centre Antalya, where the head of the CHP, Deniz Baykal, was the party’s candidate.

The main political arm of the Kurdish nationalist movement, the Democratic People's Party (DEHAP), entered these elections in a coalition with five small socialist parties, yet together these parties received fewer votes (5 percent) than the DEHAP received alone in the 2002 elections (6.1 percent).

Results by province

Metropolitan provinces are in bold. AKP denotes provinces won by the Justice & Development Party, CHP denotes provinces won by the Republican People's Party, MHP denotes provinces won by the Nationalist Movement Party, DSP denotes provinces won by the Democratic Left Party, DYP denotes provinces won by the True Path Party and SP denotes provinces won by the Felicity Party.

References

2004
2004 elections in Turkey
March 2004 events in Turkey